Isoprenaline, or isoproterenol (brand name: Isoprenaline Macure), is a medication used for the treatment of bradycardia (slow heart rate), heart block, and rarely for asthma. It is a non-selective β adrenoceptor agonist  that is the isopropylamine analog of epinephrine (adrenaline).

Medical uses
It is used to treat heart block and episodes of Adams–Stokes syndrome that are not caused by ventricular tachycardia or fibrillation, in emergencies for cardiac arrest until electric shock can be administered, for bronchospasm occurring during anesthesia, and as an adjunct in the treatment of hypovolemic shock, septic shock, low cardiac output (hypoperfusion) states, congestive heart failure, and cardiogenic shock. It is also used to prevent Torsades de Pointes in patients with long QT refractory to magnesium and to treat patients with intermittent Torsades de Pointes refractory to treatment with magnesium.

Historically, it was used to treat asthma via metered aerosol or nebulizing devices; it was also available in sublingual, oral, intravenous, and intramuscular formulations. The U.S. National Asthma Education and Prevention Program Expert Panel recommends against its use as a nebulizer for acute bronchoconstriction.

Isoprenaline can also ameliorate the impairment of intestinal stem cells mediated by β2-adrenoreceptors after chemotherapy.

Contraindications
It should not be used in people with tachyarrhythmias (except in special circumstances), tachycardia or heart block caused by digitalis poisoning, ventricular arrhythmias which require inotropic therapy, or with angina.

Adverse effects
Adverse effects of isoprenaline include nervousness, headache, dizziness, nausea, visual blurring, tachycardia, palpitations, angina, Adams-Stokes attacks, pulmonary edema, hypertension, hypotension, ventricular arrhythmias, tachyarrhythmias, difficulty breathing, sweating, mild tremors, weakness, flushing, and pallor. Isoproterenol has been reported to cause insulin resistance leading to diabetic ketoacidosis.

Pharmacology
The adverse effects of isoprenaline are also related to the drug's cardiovascular effects. Isoprenaline can produce tachycardia (an elevated heart rate), which predisposes people who take it to cardiac arrhythmias.

Pharmacodynamics
Isoprenaline is a β1 and β2 adrenoreceptor agonist and has almost no activity on alpha adrenergic receptors. Its agonist effects at TAAR1 provide it with pharmacodynamic effects that resemble those of the endogenous trace amines, like tyramine.

Isoprenaline's effects on the cardiovascular system (non-selective) relate to its actions on cardiac β1 receptors and β2 receptors on smooth muscle within the tunica media of arterioles. Isoprenaline has positive inotropic and chronotropic effects on the heart. β2 adrenoceptor stimulation in arteriolar smooth muscle induces vasodilation. Its inotropic and chronotropic effects elevate systolic blood pressure, while its vasodilatory effects tend to lower diastolic blood pressure. The overall effect is to decrease mean arterial pressure due to the β2 receptors' vasodilation.

The isopropylamine group in isoprenaline makes it selective for β receptors. The free catechol hydroxyl groups keep it susceptible to enzymatic metabolism.

Pharmacokinetics
The plasma half-life for isoproterenol is approximately two to five minutes. It is degraded enzymatically via catechol O-methyltransferase (COMT) primarily in the liver and excreted in the urine as sulfated conjugates.

Chemistry
It is structurally related to epinephrine.

History
It was first approved in the US in 1947.
Between 1963 and 1968 in England, Wales, Scotland, Ireland, Australia, and New Zealand there was an increase in deaths among people using isoprenaline to treat asthma.  This was attributed to overdose: the inhalers produced in that area were dispensing five times the dosage dispensed by inhalers produced in the US and Canada, where the deaths were not observed.

Society and culture

Brands
As of June 2017, isoprenaline was marketed under many brand names worldwide and as two different salts: Aleudrina, Asthpul, Iludrin, Isomenyl, Isoprenalin, Isoprenalina, Isoprenaline, Isoprénaline, Isoprenaline hydrochloride, Isoprenaline sulfate, Isoprenalinesulfaat, Isoprenalinsulfat, Isoprenalinum, Isopropydine, Isopropylnoradrenaline, Isoproterenol, Isoproterenol hydrochloride, Isoproterenol sulfate, Isuprel, Isuprel, Neo-Epinine, Neodrenal, Proternol, Saventrine, and Win 5162.  It is also marketed as a combination drug with cromoglicic acid as Frenal Compositum, in combination with pronase as Isopal P, and in combination with atropine as Stmerin D.

References 

Antiasthmatic drugs
Beta1-adrenergic agonists
Beta2-adrenergic agonists
Catecholamines
Inotropic agents
TAAR1 agonists
Phenylethanolamines
Isopropylamino compounds